The 2016 King's Cup is an international football tournament that is currently being held in Thailand from 3 to 6 June 2016. The 4 national teams involved in the tournament are required to register a squad of 23 players, including three goalkeepers. Only players in these squads are eligible to take part in the tournament.

Before announcing their final squad, several teams named a provisional squad of 23 to 30 players, but each country's final squad of 23 players had to be submitted by 23 May 2016. Players marked (c) were named as captain for their national squad. Number of caps counts until the start of the tournament, including all FIFA-recognized pre-tournament friendlies. Player's age is their age on the opening day of the tournament.

Thailand
The following 23 players were called up to the squad for 2016 King's Cup

United Arab Emirates
The following 23 players were called up to the squad for 2016 King's Cup

Jordan
The following players were called up for the 2016 King's Cup
Caps and goals correct as of 5 June 2016 after the game against Thailand.

Syria

Squad selected for the 2016 King's Cup.
Caps and goals as of 31 May 2016 after the match against Vietnam.

External links
 King's Cup
 Football in Thailand

2016 in Thai football cups
King's Cup